SS Isaac Shelby was a Liberty ship built in the United States during World War II. She was named after Isaac Shelby, the first and fifth Governor of Kentucky.

Construction
Isaac Shelby was laid down on 22 January 1944, under a Maritime Commission (MARCOM) contract, MC hull 1518, by J.A. Jones Construction, Brunswick, Georgia; she was sponsored by Mrs. K.D. Nichols, and launched on 6 March 1944.

History
She was allocated to the Smith & Johnson Company, on 18 March 1944. On 5 January 1945, she struck a mine off Naples, Italy, . She broke in two and sank with no loss of life. On 20 February 1948, she was sold, along with 39 other vessels, including her sister ship , for $520,000, to Venturi Salvaggi Ricuperi Imprese Marittime Societa per Azioni, Genoa.

References

Bibliography

 
 
 
 
 

 

Liberty ships
Ships built in Brunswick, Georgia
1944 ships
Maritime incidents in January 1945
Ships sunk by mines